Coleophora acerosa is a moth of the family Coleophoridae. It is found in southern Russia, Astrakhan, Kazakhstan and Uzbekistan.

The larvae feed on Horaninovia ulicina.

References

acerosa
Moths described in 1989
Moths of Asia